The FC Ingolstadt 04 II is a German association football club from the city of Ingolstadt, Bavaria. It is the reserve team of FC Ingolstadt.

History
FC Ingolstadt 04 was formed in 2004 through a merger of two local rivals, MTV Ingolstadt and ESV Ingolstadt, with the former playing in the Landesliga Bayern-Süd while the later played in the Bezirksoberliga Oberbayern at the time. The first team took MTV's place, having just been promoted to the Bayernliga, while the new reserve side took up ESV's place in the Bezirksoberliga.

The team took two seasons in this league to achieve success, winning promotion to the Landesliga in 2005. In the Landesliga, the side took again two years to move up again, to the Bayernliga, while the first team had begun its climb through the Regionalliga that would eventually culminate in the 2nd Bundesliga. After three seasons in the Bayernliga, the side finished runners-up in the league in 2010–11 and, courtesy to champions FC Ismaning declining promotion, was promoted to the Regionalliga for the following season.

The team became part of the new Regionalliga Bayern in 2012 and has played at this level since, finishing fifth in 2014–15.

Honours
The club's honours:

League
 Bayernliga (IV)
 Runners-up: 2011
 Landesliga Bayern-Süd (V)
 Runners-up: 2008
 Bezirksoberliga Oberbayern (VI)
 Runners-up: 2006

Recent managers
The teams recent managers were:

Recent seasons
The season-by-season performance of the team:

With the introduction of the Bezirksoberligas in 1988 as the new fifth tier, below the Landesligas, all leagues below dropped one tier. With the introduction of the Regionalligas in 1994 and the 3. Liga in 2008 as the new third tier, below the 2. Bundesliga, all leagues below dropped one tier. With the establishment of the Regionalliga Bayern as the new fourth tier in Bavaria in 2012 the Bayernliga was split into a northern and a southern division, the number of Landesligas expanded from three to five and the Bezirksoberligas abolished. All leagues from the Bezirksligas onward were elevated one tier.

Current squad

References

External links
 Official team site  
 FC Ingolstadt 04 II at Weltfussball.de  
 Das deutsche Fußball-Archiv  historical German domestic league tables
 Manfreds Fussball Archiv  Tables and results from the Bavarian amateur leagues

Football clubs in Germany
Bavarian reserve football teams
Association football clubs established in 2004
Football in Upper Bavaria
Reserves
German reserve football teams
FC Ingolstadt 04 II